eStem Public Charter Schools Inc. is a non-profit charter school management organization in Arkansas. eStem established eStem Elementary Public Charter School, eStem Middle Public Charter School, and eStem High Public Charter School in downtown Little Rock under a five-year charter granted by the Arkansas State Board of Education in December 2007. All three schools are open enrollment, publicly financed schools, meaning any school-aged child in Arkansas is eligible to attend. As public schools, the eStem public charter schools are tuition free.

Extracurricular activities 
The schools' mascot and athletic symbol is the Mets.  The eStem Public Charter High School is a member of the Arkansas Activities Association.

In 2014, the eStem High School Lady Mets girls basketball team won the Class 3A state basketball title, which is the school's first sports championship.

References

External links
 
 eStem Athletics

2007 establishments in Arkansas
Charter schools in Arkansas
Public high schools in Arkansas
Public middle schools in Arkansas
Public elementary schools in Arkansas
School districts in Arkansas
Non-profit organizations based in Arkansas
Buildings and structures in Little Rock, Arkansas
High schools in Little Rock, Arkansas